Chou Tao (born March 30, 1988 in Dalian, Liaoning) is a Chinese rhythmic gymnast. She won the group gold medal at the 2002 Asian Games.

She represented China at the 2008 Summer Olympics and won a silver medal in the group competition.

References

External links 
 

1988 births
Living people
Chinese rhythmic gymnasts
Gymnasts at the 2008 Summer Olympics
Olympic gymnasts of China
Olympic silver medalists for China
Sportspeople from Dalian
Olympic medalists in gymnastics
Gymnasts from Liaoning
Medalists at the 2008 Summer Olympics
21st-century Chinese women